The  2013 AFF Women's Championship, known as the 2013 AFF AYA Bank Women's Championship for sponsorship reasons, was the seventh edition of the tournament, the women's football championship of Southeast Asia. It was held from 9 September to 22 September 2013 in Yangon, Myanmar.

Though not an AFF member nation, a Japanese selection side was invited to the tournament. They won the final over Australia.

Squads

Group stage
''All times listed are Myanmar Standard Time (UTC+6:30)

Group A

Group B

Knockout stage

Semi-finals

Third place match

Final

Awards

Goalscorers
8 goals
 Joana Houplin

7 goals
 Miyuki Takahashi

6 goals

 Nisa Romyen
 Khin Moe Wai

4 goals

 Hayley Raso
 Haruka Imai

3 goals

 Asuka Matsuhashi
 Souchitta Phonharath
 San San Maw
 Yee Yee Oo

2 goals

 Tara Andrews
 Natalie Tobin
 Satsuki Hashiura
 Taneekarn Dangda
 Wilaiporn Boothduang
 Lê Thị Thương
 Lê Thu Thanh Hương
 Nguyễn Thị Minh Nguyệt

1 goal

 Amy Harrison
 Chloe Logarzo
 Brittany Whitfield
 Georgia Yeoman
 Tugiyati Cindy
 Sayaka Horiuchi
 Mina Komatsu
 Miyu Ozeki
 Manami Sunaga
 Mariko Tanaka
 Shahnaz Jebreen
 Stephanie Al-Naber
 Phonethip Sengmany
 Suphavanh Phayvanh
 Khin Marlar Tun
 Khin Than Wai
 Margret Marri
 Moe Moe War
 Natasha Alquiros
 Chalise Baysa
 Heather Cooke
 Patrice Impelido
 Marisa Park
 Sunshine Soriano
 Camille Wilson
 Alisa Rukpinij
 Rattikan Thongsombut
 Nguyễn Thị Muôn
 Nguyễn Thị Ngọc Anh
 Trần Thị Kim Hồng

Final ranking

References

External links

Tournament at soccerway.com

2013
Women
2013 in Burmese football
International association football competitions hosted by Myanmar
AFF